Shani Tarashaj (born 7 February 1995) is a Swiss retired professional footballer who played as a forward.

Club career
Tarashaj was born in Hausen am Albis, Switzerland. He grew up in youth teams of Grasshopper Club Zürich. Tarashaj made his Swiss Super League debut on 2 August 2014, coming on as a substitute for Alexander Merkel in a 0–0 draw against FC Sion. Tarashaj started 2015–16 by scoring 5 goals in his first 4 games, including two braces against FC Zurich and FC Lugano. His contract with Grasshopper was renewed, extended to 2019.

On 7 January 2016, Tarashaj joined English club Everton on a -year deal. He was loaned back to Grasshopper, until the end of the season so that he could complete his national service. He was loaned to German club Eintracht Frankfurt for the 2016–17 season.

On 19 July 2018, Tarashaj returned to Grasshopper on a season-long loan deal with an option to make the deal permanent.

Tarashaj moved to FC Emmen for a 2-season loan deal in July 2019. His loan spell was cancelled in October 2020 and on his return, he was released by Everton.

On 11 January 2021, Tarashaj joined Zürich, initially linking up with the club's under–21 side.

On 7 October 2022, Tarashaj retired from football due to injuries.

International career

Switzerland
Tarashaj was eligible to represent three countries on international level, either Albania, Kosovo or Switzerland. From 2010, until 2016, Tarashaj has been part of Switzerland at youth international level, respectively has been part of all youth teams and he with these teams played 48 matches and scored 33 goals.

On 18 March 2016, Tarashaj received a call-up from senior Swiss team for the friendly matches against Republic of Ireland and Bosnia and Herzegovina. His senior debut came seven days later in the friendly match against Republic of Ireland after coming on as a substitute at 71st minute in place of Blerim Džemaili. On 30 May 2016, Tarashaj was named as part of the Switzerland squad for UEFA Euro 2016, but only made a single appearance, coming on as a late substitute against Romania.

Proposed Kosovo switch
In July 2016, Tarashaj after the end of UEFA Euro 2016 applied for a Kosovo passport at the Kosovan Consulate in Zürich and after receiving the passport, he attempted to switch from Switzerland to Kosovo, but this switch was rejected by FIFA, because he had played competitive matches with Switzerland after Kosovo's admission to UEFA and FIFA.

Return to Switzerland
On 7 October 2016, Tarashaj after not being able to switch to Kosovo, returned to Switzerland, where he played with under-21 team in a 2017 UEFA European Under-21 Championship qualification match against Norway after being named in the starting line-up. Three days later, he was named as a senior team substitute in a 2018 FIFA World Cup qualification match against Andorra.

Personal life
Born and raised in Switzerland, Tarashaj is of Kosovo Albanian origin from Prizren. In December 2019, he completes his military service in the Swiss Armed Forces. On 28 June 2021, Tarashaj enters politics by becoming a member of the Diaspora branch of the Democratic Party of Kosovo in Zürich.

Career statistics

References

1995 births
Living people
Swiss men's footballers
Switzerland international footballers
Switzerland under-21 international footballers
Switzerland youth international footballers
Grasshopper Club Zürich players
Everton F.C. players
Eintracht Frankfurt players
FC Emmen players
Swiss people of Kosovan descent
Swiss people of Albanian descent
People from Affoltern District
Association football forwards
UEFA Euro 2016 players
Swiss expatriate footballers
Swiss expatriate sportspeople in England
Swiss expatriate sportspeople in Germany
Expatriate footballers in England
Expatriate footballers in Germany
Bundesliga players
Swiss Super League players
Eredivisie players
Sportspeople from the canton of Zürich